San Secondo Parmense (Sansecondino:  or ;) is a comune (municipality) in the Province of Parma in the Italian region Emilia-Romagna, located about  northwest of Bologna and about  northwest of Parma.

San Secondo Parmense borders the following municipalities: Fontanellato, Roccabianca, Sissa Trecasali, Soragna.

The main sights are the Rocca dei Rossi castle and the San Genesio pieve (known from 1084).

References

External links
 Official website